I26 may refer to:
 Interstate 26, a road in the United States of America